Howard Larsen was an American comic book illustrator for EC Comics and other publishers during the 1940s and 1950s.

Crime and Western comics
Specializing in crime and Western stories, Larsen contributed to several comics publishers, including American (Spy-Hunters), Avon (Romantic Love, Slave Girl, Wild Bill Hickok), Charlton Comics (Marvels of Science), Et-Es-Go (Suspense), Fiction House (Jungle Comics, Planet Comics, Wings Comics), Novelty (Blue Bolt), St. John Publications (The Texan) and Victory (X-Venture).

EC Comics
His stories for EC were in Crime Patrol #11 ("The Werewolf's Curse!"), Crime Patrol #12 ("The Hanged Man’s Revenge"), The Vault of Horror #21 ("That’s a ‘Croc’!") and Tales from the Crypt #26 ("The Borrowed Body").

References

American cartoonists
American comics artists
EC Comics
Date of birth missing
Date of death missing
Year of birth missing
Year of death missing